"One Heartbeat" is the second single released by Smokey Robinson from his 1987 album One Heartbeat. The song reached No. 10 on the Billboard Hot 100, No. 3 on the R&B singles chart, and No. 2 on the Adult Contemporary chart.

It was accompanied by a music video filmed in Southern California. The song was written by musician Brian Ray along with one-time Tommy Tutone keyboardist Steve LeGassick. The B-side, "Love Will Set You Free", is from the 1986 film Solarbabies.

The song was heard in the opening credits of the 1987 romantic comedy film Cross My Heart starring Martin Short and Annette O'Toole.

Charts

Weekly charts

Year-end charts

References

1987 singles
1987 songs
Smokey Robinson songs
Motown singles